Fol or FOL may refer to:

People 
 Alexander Fol (1933–2006), Bulgarian historian
 Alexandra Fol (born 1981), Bulgarian-Canadian composer
 Hermann Fol (1845–1892), Swiss zoologist

Other uses 
 Fol (grape), a French wine grape
 "FOL" (song), by The Smashing Pumpkins
 Figures of Light, an American proto-punk band
 First-order logic
 Flavor of Love, a television dating game show
 Folio
 Fountain of Life
 Friends of Lulu, an defunct American women's organization
 Party Workers' Liberation Front 30 May, a political party in Curaçao